Stars on Ice is a 2007 Philippine television reality show broadcast by Q. A figure skating ice dancing competition featuring Filipino celebrities. Hosted by Arnell Ignacio, it premiered on March 20, 2007. The show concluded in July 2007.

2007 Philippine television series debuts
2007 Philippine television series endings
Figure skating reality television series
Filipino-language television shows
Philippine reality television series
Q (TV network) original programming